The Methodist Episcopal Church, at 121 S. Willson in Bozeman, Montana, was built in 1873.  It was listed on the National Register of Historic Places in 1987.

Its original Gothic Revival section was started in 1883 during a brief 1882-83 period of prosperity of Bozeman, and was completed in 1884, making it the oldest existing Methodist Church in the state of Montana.

The church was organized by A.M. Hough of Virginia City, Montana in 1866. Before that there had been a Sunday school in a log house on Bozeman's Main Street in 1865. In 1869 it acquired the first bell in town.

Bricks were manufactured by W.H. Tracy.  There was a freestanding bell tower behind the church.  In 1905 a three-story square belltower with a pyramidal roof surmounted by a decorative finial was added.  In 1905-06 a two-story flat-roofed addition was added.  A further addition of a one-story flat-roofed brick section for offices was added much later, probably during remodelling in the 1950s, which also covered the original brick building with stucco.

Presumably it belongs to the Methodist Episcopal Church denomination.

References

External links

National Register of Historic Places in Gallatin County, Montana
Gothic Revival church buildings in Montana
Churches completed in 1873
Methodist churches in Montana
Buildings and structures in Bozeman, Montana
1873 establishments in Montana Territory
Churches on the National Register of Historic Places in Montana